Apart from the head office building and the R&D building of Capcom Co., Ltd., both located in Chūō-ku, Osaka, the Japanese parent company also has a branch office in the Shinjuku Mitsui Building in Nishi-Shinjuku, Shinjuku, Tokyo. It also has the Ueno Facility. a branch office in Iga, Mie Prefecture. The international Capcom Group currently encompasses 15 subsidiaries in Japan, North America, Europe, and East Asia. Affiliated companies include Koko Capcom Co., Ltd. in South Korea, Street Fighter Film, LLC in the United States, and Dellgamadas Co., Ltd.

Former subsidiaries

References

Subsidiaries
Capcom